Coconino Sandstone is a geologic formation named after its exposure in Coconino County, Arizona. This formation spreads across the Colorado Plateau province of the United States, including northern Arizona, northwest Colorado, Nevada, and Utah.

This rock formation is particularly prominent in the Grand Canyon, where it is visible as a prominent white cliff-forming layer. Either the Kaibab Limestone or Toroweap Formation overlies the Coconino Sandstone. The Coconino Sandstone is typically buff to white in color. It consists primarily of fine well-sorted quartz grains, with minor amounts of potassium feldspar grains deposited by eolian processes (wind-deposited) approximately 275 million years ago. Several structural features such as ripple marks, sand dune deposits, rain patches, slump marks, and fossil tracks are not only well preserved within the formation, but also contribute evidence of its eolian origin.

Lechatelierite (silica glass), as well as coesite and stishovite (high pressure forms of SiO2) were formed during the impact of a meteorite into the Coconino Sandstone at Barringer Crater in Arizona.

Geological sequences

Sequence of layers: Coconino Sandstone on Hermit Shale on sloping redbeds of Supai Group.

See also

 Geology of the Grand Canyon

References

External links
 Anonymous (nd) Coconino Formation, Geological Formations−Records of the Past, West Coast Regional Carbon Sequestration Partnership (WESTCARB).
 U.S. Geological Survey (2011) Coconino Sandstone, Stratigraphy of the Parks of the Colorado Plateau, U.S. Department of the Interior, Denver, Colorado.

Sandstone formations of the United States
Natural history of the Grand Canyon
Geologic formations of Arizona
Geologic formations of Colorado
Geologic formations of Nevada
Geologic formations of Utah
Geography of Coconino County, Arizona
Permian Arizona
Permian Colorado
Permian geology of Nevada
Permian geology of Utah
Permian System of North America